KDOC-FM (103.9 MHz; "Fun 104") is a radio station broadcasting a classic hits format, simulcasting KFNL-FM in Spring Valley, Minnesota. KDOC-FM is licensed to Eyota, Minnesota, and serves the Rochester, Minnesota metropolitan area. The station is owned by Townsquare Media.

The call lettres above are not to be confused with KDOC-TV, based in Los Angeles, California.

History
The station signed on April 1, 2008, as KLCX, with a classic hits format; the format and call sign were moved from 107.7 FM, which was converted to active rock station KDZZ, "Z-Rock 107.7". On March 23, 2010, the station changed its call letters to KDCZ and began simulcasting KDZZ.

On August 30, 2013, a deal was announced in which Townsquare would acquire 53 Cumulus Media stations, including KDZZ/KDCZ, for $238 million. The deal was part of Cumulus' acquisition of Dial Global; Townsquare and Dial Global were both controlled by Oaktree Capital Management. The transaction was consummated effective November 14, 2013.

On April 13, 2017, at 7:30 a.m., KDCZ split from its simulcast with KDZZ and changed its format to adult hits, branded as "103.9 The Doc". On May 16, 2017, KDCZ changed its call letters to KDOC-FM; the KDCZ call letters moved to KDZZ on June 2, 2017.

On September 10, 2021, KDOC-FM flipped to a simulcast of classic hits-formatted sister station KFNL-FM, branded as "Fun 104".

References

External links

Radio stations in Minnesota
Radio stations established in 2008
2008 establishments in Minnesota
Classic hits radio stations in the United States